The 2022 Iranian Super Cup was the 8th Iranian Super Cup, an annual football match played between the winners of the previous season's Persian Gulf Pro League, Esteghlal, and the previous season's Hazfi Cup, Nassaji. It was played on 2 November 2022 at the Shahid Bahonar Stadium, Kerman.

Esteghlal Tehran defeated Nassaji 1–0 to win their first title.

Teams

Match

Details
<onlyinclude>

References

2022
F.C. Nassaji Mazandaran matches
Esteghlal F.C. matches